Garov may refer to
Harov, a village in Azerbaijan
Iliyan Garov (born 1984), Bulgarian football defender